The Canadian Secretary to the King is the senior operational member of the royal household for the King of Canada, Charles III. The secretary is the principal channel of communication between the monarch and his Canadian government, and provincial governments, as well as managing the monarch's other correspondence in the Canadian context and drafting speeches the King delivers in Canada or on Canadian topics. The secretary is responsible for advising the prime minister "on matters related to the Canadian Crown, including providing advice on the Government of Canada's heritage-related commemorative initiatives, high level coordination of royal tours to Canada, and state ceremonial and protocol advisory functions." Additionally, the secretary chairs, ex-officio, the Advisory Committee on Vice-Regal Appointments and holds responsibility for the official programme of tours of Canada by members of the royal family.

The office was established as Canadian Secretary to the Queen in 1959. The present office holder is Donald Booth, who was appointed to the position in 2019.

History
The post was created in 1959 as the Canadian adviser to the monarch and coordinator of visits to Canada by members of the royal family.

From 1998 to 2005, the office of Canadian Secretary was held by the Sergeant-at-Arms in the House of Commons. From 2005 to 2009, the office remained vacant until Prime Minister Stephen Harper appointed the Usher of the Black Rod to the position.

In 2012, Stephen Harper made the position of Canadian Secretary to the Queen a standalone position with a mandate to "advise the Prime Minister on matters relating to the Canadian Crown." During Harper's tenure as prime minister, the role of the Canadian Secretary to the Queen was expanded, with the secretary chairing the Advisory Committee on Vice-Regal Appointments.

In November 2015, responsibility for the Canadian Secretary to the Queen was transferred from the Privy Council Office to the Minister of Canadian Heritage, then headed by Pablo Rodríguez. As a result, the office no longer reported directly to the Prime Minister. The roles and responsibilities formerly exercised by the office were assumed by the Department of Canadian Heritage from 2015 to 2019. The advisory committee on vice-regal appointments was disbanded following Harper's defeat in the 2015 federal election, and remains "dormant".

After remaining vacant for nearly three years, the position was filled in 2019 by Donald Booth, a federal civil servant who concurrently holds the position as director of the strategic policy in the Machinery of Government branch of the Privy Council Office. In the same year, the responsibility for the Canadian Secretary to the Queen were transferred back from the Department of Canadian Heritage to the Privy Council Office.

List of Canadian Secretaries to the monarch

Before 2012 the role was mainly for the duration of a royal tour of Canada.

See also
 Principal Secretary (Canada)
 Private Secretary to the Sovereign
 Secretary to the Governor General of Canada

References

External links
 Government of Canada: Vice-Regal Appointments

Monarchy in Canada